Caden Sterns (born November 2, 1999) is an American football safety for the Denver Broncos of the National Football League (NFL). He played college football at Texas.

Early years
Sterns attended Steele High School in Cibolo, Texas. Sterns older brother, Jordan, was a star two-way player in high school (2010-2013) and would later play at Oklahoma State University. During his career, Caden had 235 tackles and 11 interceptions. He was selected to play in the 2018 U.S. Army All-American Bowl and won the Pete Dawkins Trophy as the game's MVP. A five-star recruit, Sterns originally committed to play college football at Louisiana State University (LSU) before switching the University of Texas at Austin.

College career
Sterns started all 13 games his true freshman season at Texas in 2018. He was the Big 12 Defensive Freshman of the Year and was named a first-team All-Big 12 after recording 62 tackles, four interceptions and one sack. Sterns played in nine games his sophomore year in 2019, finishing with 59 tackles and one sack.

On November 30, 2020, Sterns declared for the 2021 NFL Draft and opted out of the remainder of the season.

Professional career

Sterns was drafted in the fifth round, 152nd overall, of the 2021 NFL Draft by the Denver Broncos. On May 11, 2021, Sterns officially signed with the Broncos.

On October 28, 2022, Sterns was placed on injured reserve.

Personal life
Sterns has three brothers, each of whom have played football at the collegiate level. His oldest brother Jordan played safety at Oklahoma State from 2013–16, his youngest brother Josh is currently a wide receiver at Western Kentucky Hilltoppers along with his other brother Jerreth Sterns who also plays wide receiver as well. Jerreth played at what was then known as Houston Baptist University and then transferred to Western Kentucky Hilltoppers for his senior year to play along with his teammate, quarterback Bailey Zappe. Jerreth currently plays on the Los Angeles Rams on the practice squad.

References

External links
Texas Longhorns bio

Living people
People from Cibolo, Texas
Players of American football from Texas
American football safeties
Texas Longhorns football players
Denver Broncos players
1999 births